The Remote Operations Service Element (ROSE) is the OSI service interface, specified in ITU-T Recommendation X.219, ISO/IEC International Standard 9072-1, that (a) provides remote operation capabilities, (b) allows interaction between entities in a distributed application, and (c) upon receiving a remote operations service request, allows the receiving entity to attempt the operation and report the results of the attempt to the requesting entity. 

OSI application protocols such as X.400 and X.500 use the services provided by ROSE. The ROSE protocol itself is defined using the notation of ASN.1.

References

International Telecommunication Union Recommendation X.219
International Telecommunication Union Recommendation X.229
ISO ISO 9072

See also 
Remote procedure call
Abstract Syntax Notation One
Transaction Capabilities Application Part

ITU-T recommendations